Peter John Adams (18 May 1938 – 13 December 1999) was a New Zealand-born Australian actor, best remembered for his performances in Australian television. Born in Taumarunui, New Zealand, Adams later emigrated to Australia. He died of cancer in Melbourne in 1999 at the age of 61.

Career

Television work
Adams appeared in the Australian soap opera Number 96 as Andy Marshall in 1974-75 and had a five-week stint in medical soap opera The Young Doctors as comedian, Clarrie Baker in 1977.  Adams' defining role came in 1977 when he was cast as a leading character, Detective Jeff Johnson, in the police procedural series Cop Shop. His character "JJ" became a hit with audiences, winning Adams several Logies. In 1980 he won Best Lead Actor in a Series and in 1981, the Silver Logie for Most Popular Actor. He left that series for a role in musical theatre, but later returned, staying until the series was cancelled in December 1983. He subsequently appeared in Prisoner as the tough Acting Governor Bob Moran, for three months in 1986. In 1994 he appeared in the television movie Halifax f.p. – The Feeding with Rebecca Gibney.

Stage work
While predominantly known for his television roles, Adams also worked in theatre. In 1985 he toured Victoria appearing in Warwick Moss' two-man play Down An Alley Filled With Cats. Adams directed the 1995 Geelong Lyric Theatre Society production of Les Misérables. In 1987 he appeared in the Darwin Theatre Company production of Trumpets and Raspberries.

Personal life
Adams was married to Australian actress Kirsty Child until his death in 1999.

Partial filmography

Turnabout (1940) - Photographer (uncredited)
Angels in the Outfield (1951) - Court Room Spectator (uncredited)
Pat and Mike (1952) - Colliers' Guest (uncredited)
Battle Zone (1952) - Marine Truck Driver (uncredited)
Flat Top (1952) - Plane Captain (uncredited)
Ruby Gentry (1952) - Joage-Golfer (uncredited)
The War of the Worlds (1953) - Pine Summit Fire Watcher (uncredited)
Project Moonbase (1953) - Captain Carmody
Donovan's Brain (1953) - Mr. Webster
Easy to Love (1953) - Ted Hilbert (uncredited)
Her Twelve Men (1954) - Mr. Saunders (uncredited)
Brigadoon (1954) - New York Club Patron (uncredited)
You're Never Too Young (1955) - Desk Clerk (uncredited)
The Scarlet Coat (1955) - Lt. Blair (uncredited)
Flame of the Islands (1955) - Clint Johnson (uncredited)
The Court-Martial of Billy Mitchell (1955) - Officer (uncredited)
Ransom! (1956) - George Portalis (uncredited)
Silent Fear (1956) - Pete Carroll
Omar Khayyam (1957) - Master Herald
Hell on Devil's Island (1957) - Jacques Boucher
Tip on a Dead Jockey (1957) - Tony Wilson (uncredited)
Jailhouse Rock (1957) - Jack Lease (uncredited)
Bullwhip (1958) - John Parnell
The Big Fisherman (1959) - Herod Phillip
Midnight Lace (1960) - Man at American Consulate
The Incredible Mr. Limpet (1964) - Lieutenant (uncredited)
Lord Love a Duck (1966) - Frank (uncredited)
Funny Girl (1968) - Card Player (uncredited)

References

External links
 

1938 births
1999 deaths
20th-century Australian male actors
Australian male film actors
Australian male soap opera actors
Australian male stage actors
Deaths from cancer in Victoria (Australia)
Logie Award winners
20th-century New Zealand male actors
New Zealand emigrants to Australia
New Zealand male film actors
New Zealand male soap opera actors
New Zealand male stage actors
New Zealand male television actors